Alexander James Duffield (1821–1890) was an English mining engineer, Hispanist and writer.

Life
Duffield was born at Tettenhall, near Wolverhampton in Staffordshire. He married and emigrated to South America, spending some years in Bolivia and Peru as a mining chemist, and learning Spanish. He had plans, which proved unsuccessful, to introduce alpacas into Australia, several times visited Brisbane, and reported to the Queensland government on labour for the sugar plantations. Subsequently he travelled in Spain and other countries, and for some time held an appointment under the government of Canada.

Works
Duffield published:

Masston: a Story of these Modern Days (London, 1877), novel,  with Walter Herries Pollock.
Peru in the Guano Age: being a short Account of a recent Visit to the Guano Deposits, with some Reflections on the Money they have produced and the Uses to which it has been applied (1877).
Needless Misery at Home and abounding Treasure in the West under our own Flag; Old Town and New Domains, or Birmingham and Canada revisited (1880), advocacy of English parishes purchasing land in Canada .
The Prospects of Peru, the End of the Guano Age and a Description thereof, with some Account of the Guano Deposits and "Nitrate" Plains (1881). 
Don Quixote (1881, translator), as The Ingenious Knight Don Quixote de la Mancha, a New Translation from the Originals of 1605 and 1608, with some Notes of Bowie, J. A. Pellicer, Clemencin, and others (1881, 3 vols.) This was work begun with Henry Edward Watts, of which two separate versions appeared. It hada bibliographical account of the books of chivalry connected with the story, and passages in verse rendered by James Young Gibson.
Don Quixote, his Critics and Commentators, with a brief Account of the Minor Works of Cervantes and a Statement of the Aim of the greatest of them all (1881).
The Beauty of the World: a Story of this Generation, 1886 [1885], 3 vols.
Recollections of Travels Abroad (1889).

Duffield also contributed a note on "The Lost Art of Hardening Copper" to Heinrich Schliemann's Ilios; the City and Country of the Trojans (Leipzig, 1880).

Notes

 
Attribution
 

1821 births
1890 deaths
English engineers
English translators
19th-century British translators
English male novelists
19th-century English novelists
19th-century English male writers
English male non-fiction writers